The 2014 Vuelta a España began on 23 August, with Stage 21 scheduled for 14 September. The 2014 edition of the cycle race began with the only team time trial stage of the race, in Jerez de la Frontera.

Stage 12
4 September 2014 — Logroño to Logroño,

Stage 13
5 September 2014 — Belorado to Obregón, Parque de Cabárceno,

Stage 14
6 September 2014 — Santander to La Camperona, Valle de Sábero,

Stage 15
7 September 2014 — Oviedo to Lagos de Covadonga,

Stage 16
8 September 2014 — San Martín del Rey Aurelio to La Farrapona, Lago de Somiedo,

Stage 17
10 September 2014 — Ortigueira to A Coruña,

Stage 18
11 September 2014 — A Estrada to Mont Castrove, Meis,

Stage 19
12 September 2014 — Salvaterra de Miño to Cangas do Morrazo,

Stage 20
13 September 2014 — Santo Estevo de Ribas de Sil to Puerto de Ancares,

Stage 21
14 September 2014 — Santiago de Compostela to Santiago de Compostela, individual time trial (ITT)

Notes

References

2014 Vuelta a España
Vuelta a España stages